Arthur Stringer may refer to:
 Arthur Stringer (writer) (1874-1950), Canadian writer
 Art Stringer (born 1954), American football player